Etienne Mermer (born 26 January 1977) is a former Vanuatuan footballer and the current manager of Vanuatu and the Vanuatu national under-23 football team. In the 1990s and early 2000s Mermer was one of the stars of the Vanuatu national football team. At club level he played most of his career for Vanuatu giant Tafea, but he also played for clubs in countries like Australia and Tahiti

International goals

References

1977 births
Living people
Vanuatu national football team managers
Vanuatuan footballers
Vanuatu international footballers
Tafea F.C. players
1998 OFC Nations Cup players
2000 OFC Nations Cup players
2002 OFC Nations Cup players
2004 OFC Nations Cup players
2008 OFC Nations Cup players
Association football forwards
Vanuatuan expatriate footballers
Expatriate soccer players in Australia
Expatriate footballers in French Polynesia
Vanuatuan expatriate sportspeople in Australia
Vanuatuan expatriate sportspeople in French Polynesia
Vanuatuan football managers